Genusaurus (meaning "knee lizard") is a genus of abelisauroid dinosaur from the Early Cretaceous.  Its fossils were found in France.  Genusaurus is believed to have lived during the Albian stage, around 112-100 million years ago.

Description

Genusaurus possesses several distinguishing traits. The dorsal vertebrae are elongated. The elements of the pelvis are strongly fused. The thighbone shows a low bone plateau below the major trochanter; to the front an accessory trochanter is present. The epicondyle of the inner femoral condyle is well-developed. The cnemial crest strongly extends to the front and is curved upwards. The fibula has a distinctive boss serving as an attachment for the Musculus iliofibularis. The upper inner side of the fibula is strongly hollowed out.

Size

Discovery and naming
The type species, Genusaurus sisteronis, is the only named species.  It is based on a partial skeleton found in 1984-1986 in the Albian Bevons Beds, holotype MNHN Bev.1. The holotype contains seven partial dorsal vertebrae, a piece of a sacral, a piece of an ilium, the top of a pubic bone, a thighbone, the top of a shinbone, the top of a fibula and a metatarsal.  It was named and described by Hugues Accarie, Bernard Beaudoin, Jean Dejax, Gérard Friès, Jean-Guy Michard and Philippe Taquet in 1995.  The genus name is derived from the Latin word genu (knee) and refers to the cnemial crest in front of the proximal end of the tibia.  The specific name refers to Sisteron, the town near which the specimen was found.

Classification
Accarie et al. assigned Genusaurus to the ceratosaur group of theropods, more precisely to the Coelophysoidea. A 2008 cladistic analysis by Carrano and Sampson placed Genusaurus in the Noasauridae along with Laevisuchus, Masiakasaurus, Noasaurus, and Velocisaurus; in turn, noasaurids are part of the Abelisauroidea group, which is part of the ceratosaur group. Subsequent phylogenetic analyses found Genusaurus to be a member of the Abelisauridae, specifically the Majungasaurinae.

See also

 Timeline of ceratosaur research

References

External links
 "Our Exhibitions: Genusaurus sisteronis" (in French) at the Réserve Naturelle Géologique de Haute-Provence, France.

Abelisaurids
Albian life
Early Cretaceous dinosaurs of Europe
Cretaceous France
Fossils of France
Fossil taxa described in 1995
Taxa named by Philippe Taquet